The fortieth edition of the Caribbean Series (Serie del Caribe) was held from February 4 through February 10 of  with the champion baseball teams of the Dominican Republic, Águilas Cibaeñas; Mexico, Venados de Mazatlán; Puerto Rico, Indios de Mayagüez, and Venezuela, Cardenales de Lara. The format consisted of 12 games, each team facing the other teams twice, and the games were played at Estadio Alfonso Chico Carrasquel in Puerto la Cruz, Anzoátegui, Venezuela.

Summary

Final standings

Individual leaders

All-Star team

Sources
Bjarkman, Peter. Diamonds around the Globe: The Encyclopedia of International Baseball. Greenwood. 
Serie del Caribe : History, Records and Statistics (Spanish)

Caribbean
1998
International baseball competitions hosted by Venezuela
1998 in Venezuelan sport
1998 in Caribbean sport
Sport in Puerto la Cruz
Caribbean Series